Monotropa uniflora, also known as ghost plant, ghost pipe, or Indian pipe, is an herbaceous perennial plant native to temperate regions of Asia, North America, and northern South America, but with large gaps between areas. The plant is sometimes completely waxy white, but often has black flecks or pale pink coloration. Rare variants may have a deep red color. The name "Monotropa" is Greek for "one turn" and "uniflora" is Latin for "one flowered" as there is one sharply curved stem for each single flower.

Description
These structures are small, thin, and translucent; they do not have petioles but instead extend in a sheath-like manner out of the stem.

It flowers from early summer to early autumn, often a few days after rainfall. The fruit, an oval capsule-like structure, enlarges and becomes upright when the seeds mature, at this point stem and capsule looking desiccated and dark brown or black.

Unlike most plants, it is white and does not contain chlorophyll. Instead of generating food using the energy from sunlight, it is parasitic, and more specifically a mycoheterotroph. Its hosts are certain fungi that are mycorrhizal with trees, meaning it ultimately gets its food from photosynthetic trees. Since it is not dependent on sunlight to grow, it can grow in very dark environments as in the understory of dense forest. The complex relationship that allows this plant to grow also makes propagation difficult.

Genetics 
M. uniflora is found in three general distribution areas: Asia, North America, and Central and northern South America. DNA analysis has shown that these three populations are genetically distinct from one another. Furthermore, the North American population and the Central/South American population appear to be more closely related to each other than either are related to the Asian population.

The species has 48 chromosomes.

Taxonomy 
It was formerly classified in the family Monotropaceae, but is now included within the Ericaceae. It is of ephemeral occurrence, depending on the right conditions (moisture after a dry period) to appear full grown within a couple of days.

Ecology 
The flowers of M. uniflora are visited by various bee and fly species, most commonly bumblebees. Bumblebees are an important pollen dispersal agent for the plant.

Like most mycoheterotrophic plants, M. uniflora associates with a small range of fungal hosts, all of them members of Russulaceae.

It is often associated with beech trees.

Toxicity
The plant contains glycosides and may be toxic to humans.

Uses
In addition to various reported medical uses, the plant has been used as an anxiolytic in herbal medicine since the late 19th century.

Despite possibly being toxic, the entire plant can be cooked, which lends it an asparagus-like flavor.

Gallery

References

External links

 "Indian Pipes, Ithaca NY" is a photo chronology of their development through the season.  
 Several images are available from the USDA PLANTS Profile.

Monotropoideae
Parasitic plants
Flora of Asia
Flora of South America
Flora of North America
Plants described in 1753
Taxa named by Carl Linnaeus